This is a list of the 14 members of the European Parliament for Finland in the 2004 to 2009 session.

List

Party representation

Notes

External links
Elected Members of European Parliament 2004 (in English)

Finland
List
2004